NGC 986 is a barred spiral galaxy in the southern constellation of Fornax, located about 76 million light-years away. It was discovered on August 5, 1826 by the Scottish astronomer James Dunlop, who described it as a "faint nebula, of an irregular round figure". It belongs to the Fornax Cluster of galaxies. The two appear unconnected.

The morphological class of NGC 986 is (R′1)SB(rs)b, indicating this is a barred spiral (SB) with an outer pseudo-ring (R′1), an incomplete inner ring (rs), and moderately wound spiral arms (b). The galactic plane is inclined at an angle of 37° to the line of sight from the Earth. The resulting ellipsoidal profile has its major axis aligned along a position angle of 127°.

The nucleus of NGC 986 is undergoing intense star formation and there is an H II region at the core. The large central bar extends  and is rich in dense gas. The galaxy contains two large, extended and slightly warped arms that begin at each end of the central bar, forming an S-shape. There may be a tidally-disrupted dwarf galaxy at the end of its northern arm.

References

External links 
 

Barred spiral galaxies
Fornax (constellation)
0986
Astronomical objects discovered in 1826
009747